United Nations Security Council Resolution 2034 was unanimously adopted on 19 January 2012. Noting with regret the resignation of Judge of the International Court of Justice Awn Shawkat Al-Khasawneh, the Council decided that, in accordance with the Statute of the Court, elections to fill the vacancy would be held at a session of the Security Council and during the next session of the General Assembly.

Al-Khasawneh, a jurist and former Prime Minister of Jordan, began serving on the Court on February 6, 2000 and served as its Vice President between 2006 and 2009.

See also 
List of United Nations Security Council Resolutions 2001 to 2100

References

External links
Text of the Resolution at undocs.org

2012 United Nations Security Council resolutions
United Nations Security Council resolutions concerning the International Court of Justice
January 2012 events